Brock Allen Bowers (born December 13, 2002) is an American football tight end for the Georgia Bulldogs. He was named the SEC's Freshman of the Year in 2021 and won the John Mackey Award the following year.

High school career
Bowers attended Napa High School in Napa, California. Bowers was a four-star recruit and the third-ranked tight end in his class. He committed to the University of Georgia to play college football.

College career

2021 

Bowers became an immediate starter his true freshman year at Georgia in 2021. In his first career game, he had six receptions for 43 yards. The following week, he scored his first career touchdown against UAB. His first career rushing touchdown came against Vanderbilt on a 12-yard run. He finished the season with 11 touchdowns, breaking the single-season record at Georgia for most touchdowns by a tight end and most yards in a season by a freshman. Bowers recorded 791 yards on 47 receptions and rushed for 55 yards on three carries. Bowers was named SEC Freshman of the Year and was included on the All-SEC first team.

References

External links
Georgia Bulldogs bio

Living people
People from Napa, California
Players of American football from California
Sportspeople from the San Francisco Bay Area
American football tight ends
Georgia Bulldogs football players
2001 births